William Douglas Burden (born July 29, 1965 in Rutland, Vermont) is an American rower and descendant of the Vanderbilt family through his great great grandmother Emily Thorn Vanderbilt.

See also
 List of Princeton University Olympians

References 
 
 

1965 births
American male rowers
Living people
Medalists at the 1988 Summer Olympics
Medalists at the 1992 Summer Olympics
Olympic bronze medalists for the United States in rowing
Olympic silver medalists for the United States in rowing
Rowers at the 1988 Summer Olympics
Rowers at the 1992 Summer Olympics
Rowers at the 1996 Summer Olympics
Sportspeople from Vermont
Doug Burden
World Rowing Championships medalists for the United States